The Iso Rivolta is a grand tourer introduced in 1962 by Italian automobile manufacturer Iso Automotoveicoli S.p.A. Company chairman Renzo Rivolta and his colleague, former Ferrari engineer Giotto Bizzarrini, saw it as a gran turismo in the original sense of the term, designed for long and memorable journeys. It was the first luxury automobile introduced by the company which formerly specialised in affordable motor vehicles. For motor racing, an entirely different variant was made which bore a strong resemblance to the 1962 model Ferrari 250 GT SWB Breadvan and was homologated as a touring car.

History 
Iso, a well known manufacturer of motor cycles and micro cars, especially the Isetta bubble car decided to enter the lucrative luxury car market in the early 60s. The idea behind this was a car that was usable everyday while being price between a Jaguar and a Ferrari. For mechanical development of the car, the company founder and chairman entrusted Giotto Bizzarrini of Società Autostar. Bizzarrini developed a pressed steel and welded panel chassis which was designed to flex fore and aft and proved to be rigid along with cost effective to manufacture. The de Dion rear suspension and four wheel disc brakes would be shared with contemporary luxury offerings at the time. While the front suspension would consist of unequal length wishbones. The elegant body style was the work of a young Giorgetto Giugiaro who was working at Bertone at the time.

For the drivetrain, Iso would follow the same concept as adopted by De Tomaso and would choose an American built drivetrain. The car would be fitted with a Chevrolet 327 V8 engine mated initially to a 4-speed manual transmission from BorgWarner. It would be offered with a 5-speed manual transmission and a 3-speed automatic transmission as well later on in its production life cycle. The IR 300 would be joined by a high performance IR 340 variant in 1964.

The new car named the Rivolta IR 300 was presented to the public at the 1962 Torino Motor Show to a positive reception. 797 units of the IR 300 would be made before production would end in 1970 amid slow sales. 167 cars made were the IR 340 models.

Specifications 

The manufacturer wanted the car to be known for its powerful engine, high quality of construction and elegant style. Expensive press-tool dies were produced, but volumes never justified the investment in presses to go with them, and for several years the dies were kept at the factory and periodically sent out to be fitted to a sub-contracted press in the area in order that a batch of body panels could be produced.

Engine and running gear 
The engine use was a 5.4 litre Chevrolet small block engine, similar to one of the units installed in the Chevrolet Corvette. The all-synchromesh 4-speed gearbox came from BorgWarner and was operated with a central floor mounted stick shift. A 3-speed automatic transmission along with a 5-speed manual transmission were also offered.

Chassis 
The front wheels of the Iso Rivolta 300 are suspended by linkages of uneven length with a sway bar. The rear wheels are attached with twin trailing arms using a De Dion axle located by parallel radius arms with a transverse Watt's linkage along with a Salisbury limited slip differential. Coil springs and telescopic hydraulic shock absorbers are fitted to all four wheels. The Dunlop brakes are servo assisted and are fitted to all four wheels inboard.

Interior & Exterior 

The Bertone designed coupé has a wheelbase of 270 cm, which enables five people to sit in comfort. As an option, the interior was equipped with leather seats. The arrangement of steering wheel, gear shift, switches and pedals is considered as exemplary.

Technical data 

Note: Technical data vary between the sources.

Sources 
 Etienne Cornil Fuhr: Iso Rivolta. In: Motor Revue. Vereinigte Motorverlage, Heft 50, Sommerausgabe 1964, S. 42–45.
 Katalog 100 Sportwagen, Band 13, 11. Auflage. Gildeverlag, Alfeld 1964

References 

Rivolta 300, Iso
Cars introduced in 1962
Rear-wheel-drive vehicles
Grand tourers
Coupés